John or Jon McLaughlin may refer to:

Arts and entertainment
 John McLaughlin (musician) (born 1942), English jazz fusion guitarist, member of Mahavishnu Orchestra
 Jon McLaughlin (musician) (born 1982), American singer-songwriter
 John McLaughlin (artist) (1898–1976), California hard-edge painter
 "John McLaughlin", a song on the Miles Davis album Bitches Brew
 John McLaughlin, co-writer of the 2010 film Black Swan

Politics
 John McLaughlin (Ontario politician) (1849–1911), politician in Ontario, Canada
 John McLaughlin (Alberta politician) (1905–1991), provincial level politician from Alberta, Canada
 John McLaughlin (Australian politician) (1850–1918), New South Wales politician
 John E. McLaughlin (born 1942), former deputy director and acting director of the Central Intelligence Agency
 John McLaughlin (host) (1927–2016), political commentator, host of The McLaughlin Group

Sports
 John McLaughlin (American football), American football player
 John McLaughlin (footballer, born 1890), Scottish footballer who played for Hamilton Academical and Morton
 John McLaughlin (footballer, born 1936), Scottish footballer who played for Clyde, Greenock Morton, Millwall, Dunfermline Athletic and Motherwell
 John McLaughlin (footballer, born 1944) (1944–2011), Scottish footballer who played for Queen's Park
 John McLaughlin (footballer, born 1948), Scottish footballer who played for Falkirk, Everton, and the Seattle Sounders
 John McLaughlin (footballer, born 1952), English footballer who played for Liverpool and Portsmouth
 John McLaughlin (footballer, born 1954), English footballer who played for Colchester United, Swindon Town and Portsmouth
 Jon McLaughlin (footballer) (born 1987), Scottish footballer,  Rangers goalkeeper

Others
 John Fletcher McLaughlin (1863–1933), theologian
 John J. McLaughlin (1865–1914), founder of the Canada Dry brand of soft drinks
 John N. McLaughlin (1918–2002), United States Marine Corps general and POW
 John C. McLaughlin (1921–2013), professor of English and linguistics at the University of Iowa

See also
 John McCloughlin (born 1958), Irish lawn and carpet bowler
 John McLoughlin (disambiguation)
 John MacLaughlin (disambiguation)
 John Laughlin (disambiguation)